Seydan may refer to:
 Seyidan, a village and municipality in Azerbaijan
 Seydan, Kurdistan, a village in Iran
 Seydan, Bijar, Kurdistan Province, a village in Iran
 Seydan, West Azerbaijan, a village in Iran
 Seydun, a city in Iran
 Seyyedan, a city in Iran
 Seydan, alternate name of Farah Kosh-e Olya, a village in Iran

See also
 Seyyedan (disambiguation)